Revival of the Fittest is an album by tenor saxophonist Eric Alexander. It was recorded in 2009 and released by HighNote Records.

Recording and music
The album was recorded at the Van Gelder Studio. It was produced by Don Sickler. For all but one of the tracks, the four musicians are tenor saxophonist Eric Alexander, pianist Harold Mabern, bassist Nat Reeves, and drummer Joe Farnsworth. These were recorded on April 14, 2009. Fourteen days later, "Yasashiku (Gently)" was recorded; it is a duet by Alexander and pianist Mike LeDonne. Two of the compositions – "Too Late Fall Back Baby" and "Blues for Phineas" – are Mabern compositions that he had recorded on his own albums.

Release and reception

Revival of the Fittest was released by HighNote Records. The AllMusic reviewer concluded that "Revival of the Fittest is yet another example of how rewarding an Alexander album can be when Mabern is on board."

Track listing
"Revival"
"My Grown-Up Christmas List"
"The Island"
"Too Late Fall Back Baby"
"Love-Wise"
"Blues for Phineas"
"You Must Believe in Spring"
"Yasashiku (Gently)"

Personnel
Eric Alexander – tenor saxophone
Harold Mabern – piano (tracks 1–7)
Mike LeDonne – piano (track 8)
Nat Reeves – bass (tracks 1–7)
Joe Farnsworth – drums (tracks 1–7)

References

2009 albums
Eric Alexander (jazz saxophonist) albums
HighNote Records albums
Albums recorded at Van Gelder Studio